Events from 1686 in the Kingdom of Scotland

Incumbents
 Monarch – James VII 
 Secretary of State – John Drummond, 1st Earl of Melfort

Events
 Construction of the following buildings in Lothian:
 Newhailes House
 Signal Tower (as windmill), Leith
 Woolmet House
 Soutra Aisle (modified).

Births
 15 October – Allan Ramsay, poet (died 1758)
 1 November – Colin Campbell, merchant and entrepreneur, co-founder of the Swedish East India Company (died 1757)
 John Alexander, painter (died c.1766)

Deaths
 11 November – Colin Falconer, bishop, (born 1623)

See also
 Timeline of Scottish history

References

 
1680s in Scotland